The COVID-19 pandemic in Central Luzon is part of the worldwide pandemic of coronavirus disease 2019 caused by severe acute respiratory syndrome coronavirus 2. The virus reached Central Luzon on March 9, 2020, when the first case of the disease was confirmed in San Jose del Monte. All provinces in the region have recorded COVID-19 cases. As of August 14, 2022. Central Luzon has 376,747 cases with 6,995 deaths.

Background
The first case was initially reported to be a resident of Santa Maria, Bulacan but was eventually clarified to be from San Jose del Monte, still in the same province. The patient has no travel history abroad. The first case per province by date of confirmation as is as follows:

Pampanga – March 13, 2020
Bataan – March 14, 2020
Nueva Ecija – March 22, 2020
Tarlac and Zambales – March 26, 2020; the first case in Tarlac is a 75-year-old woman from Barangay Patalan in Paniqui while the second patient is a 39-year-old man from Barangay Pinasling in Gerona. In Zambales the first case is a 73-year-old US citizen living in Barangay San Gregorio in San Antonio who had traveled from Cavite to Manila before returning to the province on March 15.
Olongapo – March 28, 2020
Aurora – August 12, 2020
On July 6, 2020, the number of confirmed COVID-19 cases in the region has breached the 1,000 mark with 1,021 cases and 75 deaths.

Tally of cases

Response

Repatriation from abroad 
Central Luzon was also a major quarantine site for repatriates from abroad, particularly New Clark City Sports Hub in Capas, Tarlac. The first two COVID-19 cases among repatriates in New Clark City were confirmed on March 11.

Lockdowns

The region is under the scope of the enhanced community quarantine in Luzon imposed by the national government on March 16, 2020.

Quarantine facilities
In April 2020, the national government began converting the ASEAN Convention Center at the Clark Freeport Zone, Pampanga and the National Government Administrative Center in Capas, Tarlac to COVID-19 quarantine facilities. The Iglesia ni Cristo also allowed the national government to lend the Philippine Arena at the Ciudad de Victoria in Bulacan to be re-purposed for the same reason. The INC also offered the Garden Suites, also within the CDV as temporary residence for health workers.

Testing
Initially, suspected COVID-19 cases in Central Luzon are tested at the Research Institute for Tropical Medicine and Lung Center of the Philippines in Metro Manila. The Jose B. Lingad Regional Memorial Hospital in Pampanga was the first facility being prepared as a possible COVID-19 testing center for the region. As of March 19, 2021, there are 17 accredited testing laboratories in the region: two in Bataan, five in Bulacan, five in Pampanga, three in Tarlac and two in Zambales.

References

Notes

Central Luzon
History of Central Luzon